Mahanayak Vasant Tu is a 2015 Indian Marathi language biopic film starring Chinmay Mandlekar.  It is based on the life of ex Chief Minister of Maharashtra state Shree Vasantrao Naik. He was the Chief Minister of Maharashtra for more than 11 years (3 terms) from 5 December 1963  to  20 February 1975. The film stars Chinmay Mandlekar as Vasantrao Naik, Nisha Parulekar, Bharat Ganeshpure, Ravi Patwardhan, Prakash Dhotre, Jayraj Nair. The film also has a special appearance by popular actress Prajakta Mali. The film is written and directed by Nilesh Jalamkar. And produced by Baliram Rathod under the banner Aditie Film Production House.

Special Prosthetic makeup has been used to transform Chinmay Mandlekar to look like Shree Vasantrao Naik. Apart from make up, vfx has also been used to make it more realistic and lively. The vfx work (make-up clean up) took around 9 months to complete.

Plot
Mahanayak Vasnat Tu showcases the life of Shree Vasantrao Naik, right from his childhood days to his time as the Chief Minister of Maharashtra. The film shows various stages and instances  of his personal and political life, and how he over came various obstacles with the help of  his foresight and positive personality. The film is set in pre independence and post independence era.

Cast
 Chinmay Mandlekar as Vasantrao Naik
 Nisha Parulekar as Vatsala Naik
 Prakash Dhotre as Fulsingh Naik
 Ravi Patwardhan as Chatursingh Naik
 Bharat Ganeshpure as Balasaheb Desai
 Jayraj Nair as Satwarrao Naik
 Satish Phadke as Jambuwantrao Dhote
 Ashish Kulkarni
 Jayant Patrikar
 Yayati Rajwade
 Prajakta Mali Guest appearance

Production
The Film was announced in July 2013. The filming took place in 3 schedule. Most of the shooting took place in Akola and near by places. Pusad was also a main location. The final schedule was shot in Mumbai.
4 different looks are used on Chinmay Mandlekar as he portrays Shree Vasantrao Naik from the age of 20 years to 60 years

Soundtrack

The film has 4 melodious songs ranging from romantic ballad to.
The music and background music is composed by Mandar Khare and songs are written by Anant Khelkar, Ilahi Jamadar, and Nilesh Jalamkar.

References

2015 films
2010s Marathi-language films
Indian biographical films
2010s biographical films